The canton of Aix-les-Bains-2 is an administrative division of the Savoie department, southeastern France. It was created at the French canton reorganisation which came into effect in March 2015. Its seat is in Aix-les-Bains.

It consists of the following communes:
Aix-les-Bains (partly)
Mouxy
Tresserve

References

Cantons of Savoie